Suburban Transit is a bus operator in central New Jersey owned by Coach USA which provides commuter bus service from Mercer, Somerset, and Middlesex County to New York City and local bus service along the New Jersey Route 27 and U.S. Route 130 in Middlesex County.

Routes

References

External links
Suburban Transit official website

Stagecoach Group bus operators in the United States and Canada
Surface transportation in Greater New York
Bus transportation in New Jersey
Transport companies established in 1941
Transportation in Middlesex County, New Jersey
1941 establishments in New Jersey